Gregor van Offeren (born 21 April 1979 in Haarlem, Netherlands), better known as Gregor Salto, is a Dutch DJ and record producer.

Biography

Dominating the Dutch club scene for over a decade, Haarlem native Gregor Salto has become famous amongst dance music lovers all across the world. Having mastered his distinct and versatile sound over the years, Gregor emanates a truly global and exciting blend that fuses elements of soul, Latin-funk and African-grooves laid over a solid base of house and electro four-to-the-floor. Headlining some of the most important festivals and clubs, Gregor has played at Tomorrowland, Ultra Music Festival, Global Gathering,  Mysteryland and countless performances in his native Netherlands. 

HIGHLIGHTS

Dr. Kucho! & Gregor Salto ft. Ane Brun - Can't Stop Playing (Makes Me High) [Oliver Heldens Remix]
1 position Beatport overall chart
1 position UK Dance Charts
4 position official UK single charts
12 position Dutch Top 40
33 position Ultratop Belgium

Grammy Award

The track ‘Echa Pa’lla’ with Pitbull lead to a Grammy award, and won him a coveted ASCAP (American Society of Composers, Authors & Publishers) Award. 

Collaborations and remixes
Gregor Salto worked with the biggest names in the world like Afrojack, Fatboy Slim, Sander van Doorn, Oliver Heldens, Chuckie, Wiwek and many more.
Besides that he made remixes for stars like Major Lazer, Rita Ora, Ariana Grande, J-Lo, Mariah Carey and many others. 

Live

Played at the biggest clubs and festivals worldwide;
Tomorrowland, Ultra Music Festival Miami, Amnesia, Sunburn, Spinnin’ Sessions, Summerfestival, Hï Ibiza, Mysteryland, Parookaville, Ultra Europe, Pacha, Ministry of Sound, Ushuaïa, Extrema, RFM Somnii, Electric Jungle Music Festival, Dirty Dutch, Emporium, Global Gathering, Amsterdam Open Air and many more.

Discography

Charting singles

Albums
 2014: Gregor Salto Ultimate Miami 2 [G-REX Music]

EPs
 2016: Para Você EP [SPRS]

Singles
 2012: Danny [Wall Recordings]
 2012: Azumba [Mixmash Records]
 2012: Gimme Sum (with Chocolate Puma) [Pssst Music]
 2013: Toys Are Nuts 2013 (with Chuckie) [G-REX Music]
 2013: Foxy (with Funkin Matt) [Mixmash Records]
 2013: Otro Dia [Moganga]
 2013: Intimi (with Wiwek) [Mixmash Records]
 2013: Drumology [LEDS]
 2013: Samba Do Mundo (Fatboy Slim Presents Gregor Salto) [Decca (UMO)]
 2014: Para Voce [G-REX Music]
 2014: Rumble (featuring MC Spyder) [DOORN (Spinnin')]
 2014: Girls Tipsy (with East & Young featuring MC Spyder) [Rimbu]
 2015: On Your Mark (with Wiwek) [G-REX Music]
 2015: Afrobot (Wiwek Remix) [DOORN (Spinnin')]
 2015: Miami (with Wiwek) [DOORN (Spinnin')]
 2015: Trouble (with Wiwek featuring MC Spyder) [DOORN (Spinnin')]
 2015: Just Yeah (with Mitchell Niemeyer) [Spinnin' Deep]
 2015: Love Is My Game (Remix) (with Dr. Kucho!, Lucas & Steve) [Spinnin' Deep]
 2016: How It Goes (with Wiwek featuring Stush) [Spinnin' Records]
 2016: Tribal (with Sander van Doorn) [DOORN (Spinnin')]
 2017: PULA (with Roulsen featuring Dudu Capoeira) [Flamingo Recordings]
 2017: Yala (featuring Teema) [Salto Sounds (Moganga)]
 2017: Magalenha (with Simon Fava featuring Sergio Mendes) [SPRS]
 2018: Brut Riddim (with Sidney Samson) [Salto Sounds (Moganga)]
 2018: Fan Of Your Love (with Ruby Prophet) [SOURCE]
 2018: So Hot (with Wiwek and Kuenta I Tambu featuring Spyder) [Spinnin' Records]
 2019: Time [Spinnin' Records]
 2019: Feeling Wet (with Nikisha Reyes) [G-REX Music]
 2020: Jaleo (with Kenny Brian) [Salto Sounds]
 2021: Child of the Rainbow (with BCUC) [Salto Sounds]
 2021: Bangene (with BCUC) [Salto Sounds]

Remixes and edits
 2012: Rihanna - Diamonds (Gregor Salto Remix Radio Edit) [Def Jam]
 2012: Nicky Romero, NERVO - Like Home (Gregor Salto Remix) [Protocol Recordings]
 2012: Shazalakazoo, Chernobyl, Suppa Fla - Zica Memo (Gregor Salto Remix) [Downpitch]
 2012: Pitbull - Back In Time (Gregor Salto Remix)
 2013: Shazalakazoo, Chernobyl, Zuzuka Poderosa - As Mulher (Gregor Salto Remix) [G-REX]
 2013: Duck Sauce - It's You (Gregor Salto Remix) [3beat Records]
 2014: Rita Ora - I Will Never Let You Down (Gregor Salto Vegas Club Mix) [Roc Nation]
 2014: Dr. Kucho!, Gregor Salto - Can't Stop Playing (Oliver Heldens and Gregor Salto Remix) [Spinnin' Records]
 2015: Major Lazer, Ellie Goulding, Tarrus Riley - Powerful (Gregor Salto Remix)
 2015: Theo / Gabe Ramos - Samboodee (Gregor Salto Club Mix) [Nervous Records]
 2016: Flo Rida, Sam Martin - Dirty Mind (Gregor Salto Remix) [Poe Boy/Atlantic]
 2016: Cheat Codes, Kris Kross Amsterdam - Sex (Gregor Salto Remix) [Spinnin' Remixes]
 2016: Tara McDonald - I Need a Miracle (Tara McDonald song) Europride anthem 2016 (Gregor Salto Remix)
 2017: Iwan Esseboom - Wittie Visie (Gregor Salto Remix) [G-REX]
 2017: Galantis, ROZES - Girls On Boys (Gregor Salto Remix) [Big Beat]
 2018: Gregor Salto, Red - Looking Good (Steff Da Campo and Gregor Salto Remix) [SPRS]
 2019: Gregor Salto – Azumba (Wiwek & Gregor Salto Remix) [Mixmash]
 2019: Miguel O’Syrah & Gregor Salto feat. Thais – Mexer (Rework) [Salto Sounds]
 2020: Andrew Mathers & Dudu Capoeira – Wheppa (Gregor Salto Remix) [Salto Sounds]
 2021: Ultra Nate – Free (Live Your Life) (Ibitaly & Gregor Salto Remix) [Blufire]
 2021: Timmy Thomas – Why Can't We Live Together (Gregor Salto & Ibitaly Remix) [High Fashion Music]

References

Notes
 A  Did not enter the Ultratop 50, but peaked on the Flemish Ultratip chart.
 B  Did not enter the Ultratop 50, but peaked on the Walloon Ultratip chart.
 C  Did not enter the Singles Top 100 or Ultratop 50, but peaked on the Dance chart.
 D  Did not enter the Ultratop 50, but peaked on the Dance Bubbling Under chart.

Sources

External links
 
 Beatport

1976 births
Dutch dance musicians
Dutch house musicians
Dutch DJs
DJs from Haarlem
Dutch record producers
Living people
Remixers
Future house musicians
Electronic dance music DJs